Yunnan Television or YNTV is a television station located in Yunnan, China. It began broadcasting on October 1, 1969.

Channels
Yunnan Satellite Channel
Yunnan Television 2 (City Channel)
Yunnan Television 3 (Entertainment  Channel)
Yunnan Television 4 (Life information  Channel)
Yunnan Television 5 (Movie Channel)
Yunnan Television 6 (Public Channel)
Yunnan Television 8 (Children Channel)
Yunnan Lancang-Mekong International Channel

See also
List of Chinese-language television channels
Television in the People's Republic of China

References
Yunnan Television - chinaculture.org

External links
 Official Website  

Television networks in China
Television channels and stations established in 1969
Kunming